Howard Fowler (20 October 1857 – 6 May 1934) was an English sportsman who played international rugby union for England and first-class cricket.

Fowler attended Clifton College and captained their cricket XI in 1876, before going to New College, Oxford, where he studied law. He played 15 first-class matches, as a wicket-keeper, for the university's cricket team and in both 1878 and 1879 was captain of the Oxford University RFC.

A forward, he played club rugby for Walthamstow and represented England in three Tests. He appeared against Scotland in 1878 and played against both Wales and Scotland in 1881.
 
He also played cricket for Essex, from 1877 to 1889, but at this point Essex fixtures were not ranked as first-class. His two other first-class matches were for the Marylebone Cricket Club and Old Oxonians.

Two of his brothers, Bill Fowler and Gerald Fowler, both played cricket for Somerset.

References

1857 births
1934 deaths
Alumni of New College, Oxford
England international rugby union players
English barristers
English cricketers
English rugby union players
Marylebone Cricket Club cricketers
Old Oxonians cricketers
Oxford University cricketers
Oxford University RFC players
People educated at Clifton College
Rugby union players from Tottenham
Wicket-keepers